Leyrielton Moura de Morais, or simply Leyrielton (June 22, 1988 in Goiânia), is a Brazilian right back. Most recently, he spent the 2016 season with Thunder Bay of the USL PDL.

He made his professional debut for Goiás in a 0-1 away defeat to Fluminense in the Campeonato Brasileiro on April 22, 2006.

Honours
Goiás State League: 2006
U-17 World Cup: 2005 (Runner Up)

Contract
17 July 2006 to 16 July 2011 (Terminated contract)

References

External links

CBF 

zerozero.pt 
globoesporte 

1988 births
Living people
Brazilian footballers
Goiás Esporte Clube players
Associação Desportiva São Caetano players
Oeste Futebol Clube players
Associação Desportiva Recreativa e Cultural Icasa players
Association football defenders
Sportspeople from Goiânia